The Battle of Bosra was fought in 634 CE between the Rashidun Caliphate army and the Byzantine Empire over the possession of the city of Bosra, in Syria. The city was one of the Islamic forces' first significant captures and was at the time the capital of the Ghassanid Kingdom (which was itself a Byzantine vassal state). The siege took place between the months of June and July in 634 CE.

Background
Caliph Abu Bakr sent his four corps under Amr ibn al-A'as, Abu Ubaidah ibn al-Jarrah, Shurahbil ibn Hasana, and Yazid ibn Abi Sufyan to capture different districts in Syria. The four were initially unsuccessful due to the concentration of the Byzantine army's strength at Ajnadayn. Abu Bakr sent Khalid ibn Walid to Syria to take command of the Rashidun army there. Khalid ibn Walid reached Syria and captured several towns, after which he reached the city of Bosra in June of 634 CE. According to his instructions, Abu Ubaidah ibn al-Jarrah, who had already occupied the District of Hauran, which lay north-east of the river Yarmouk, was to remain at his position until Khalid arrived at Bosra. Abu Ubaidah ibn al-Jarrah had three corps of an army made up of Muslim soldiers under his command––his own, Yazid's, and Shurahbil's––but had fought no battles and captured no towns. Bosra, a large town and the capital of the Ghassanid Kingdom, contained a force of Byzantine and Christian Arabs, commanded by Roman officers.

While Khalid was in eastern Syria, Abu Ubaidah learned that he would serve under Khalid upon the latter's arrival. Upon receiving this news, he sent Shurahbil with 4,000 men to capture Bosra, the garrison of which withdrew into the fortified town as soon as the soldiers appeared in sight. This garrison consisted of 4,000 soldiers who all expected that more Islamic forces would soon arrive and that Shurahbil detachment was only an advance guard, and remained within the walls of the fort. Shurahbil camped on the western side of the town and positioned groups of his men all around the fort.

After two days, as Khalid ibn al-Walid set out on the last day of his march to Bosra, the garrison of Bosra advanced towards the Muslim army outside the city. Shurahbil and the Roman commander held talks with their forces drawn up for battle; the Muslims offered three choices: Islam, tribute, or the sword. When the Byzantines chose the sword, in the middle of the morning, the battle began.

For the first few hours, the fighting continued at a steady pace, with neither side making any headway; but soon after midday, the superior strength of the Romans turned the battle in their favor. The Romans moved forces around both of Shurahbil's flanks and the fighting increased in intensity. The temper of Shurahbil's soldiers became suicidal as the real danger of their position became evident, and they fought with ferocity to avoid encirclement, which appeared to be the Roman's goal. By early afternoon, the Roman wings had moved further forward, and the encirclement of Shurahbil's force became a virtual certainty. Then, suddenly, the combatants became aware of a powerful cavalry force galloping towards the battlefield from the northwest.

Khalid was about a mile from Bosra when the wind carried the sounds of battle to him. He immediately ordered the men to horse; as soon as the cavalry was ready, he led it towards the battle field. The Romans withdrew soon after they became aware of the cavalry's arrival. The Muslims under Shurahbil came to regard Khalid's arrival as a miracle.

The Battle
The next morning, the Byzantine garrison launched another attack. The shock of Khalid's arrival the previous day had now worn off, and seeing that the combined strength of the Muslims was about the same as their own, the Romans decided to attack again, hoping to fight and defeat the Muslims before they could get any rest after their lengthy march.

The two armies formed up for battle on the plain outside the town. Khalid kept the center of the Rashidun army under his own command, appointing Rafay bin Umayr as the commander of the right wing and Dhiraar bin Al-Azwar as the commander of the left wing. In front of the center, he placed a thin screen under Abdur-Rahman bin Abu Bakr (son of the Caliph Abu Bakr). At the very start of the battle, Abdur-Rahman dueled with the Roman army commander and defeated him. As the Roman general fled to the safety of friendly ranks, Khalid launched an attack along the entire front. For some time, the Romans resisted, while the commanders of the Muslim wings played havoc with the opposing wings; Dharar himself established a personal tradition which would make him famous in Syria, adored by the Muslims and dreaded by the Romans. Because of the heat of the day, he took off his coat of chain mail, followed by his shirt. In this half-naked condition, Dharar launched his assaults against the Romans and defeated all who faced him in single combat. Within a week, stories of the Naked Champion would spread over Syria; only the bravest of Romans would face him in combat.

After some fighting, the Byzantine army broke contact and withdrew into the fort. At this time, Khalid was fighting on foot in front of his center. As he turned to give orders for the commencement of the siege, he saw a horseman approaching through the ranks of the Muslims. It was Abu Ubaidah ibn al-Jarrah, and with him was a yellow standard that is believed to have belonged to Muhammad at the Battle of Khaybar. The horseman gave that standard to Khalid ibn al-Walid, who took it:

The Muslims now laid siege to Bosra. The Byzantine commander lost hope; knowing that most of the available reserves had either moved or were moving to Ajnadayn, he doubted that any help would arrive. After a few days of inactivity, he surrendered the fort. The only condition Khalid bin Walid imposed on Bosra was the payment of the tribute. This surrender took place in the middle of July 634.

Aftermath

The conquest of Bosra in the second week of July 634 represented the first important Muslim victory in Syria. The Muslims lost 130 men in the battle, while the Byzantines suffered several thousand casualties. The conquest of Bosra opened the Muslim conquest of Syria.

Khalid bin Walid wrote to Caliph Abu Bakr, informing him of the progress of his operations since his entry into Syria, and sent one-fifth of the spoils which had been won during the past few weeks. Hardly had Bosra surrendered when an agent sent by Shurahbil to the region of Ajnadayn returned to inform the Muslims that the concentration of Roman legions was proceeding apace. Soon they would have a vast army of 90,000 imperial soldiers at Ajnadayn. Khalid ibn Walid ordered all the Muslim corps in Syria to concentrate at Ajnadayn and defeated the Byzantine army in the Battle of Ajnadayn.

References

Sources 

 

https://www.middleeasteye.net/news/fsa-take-control-ancient-city-southern-syria

Bosra
Bosra
Bosra
Bosra
Bosra
630s in the Byzantine Empire
Bosra
Muslim conquest of the Levant